|}

The Punchestown Gold Cup is a Grade 1 National Hunt steeplechase in Ireland which is open to horses aged five years or older. It is run at Punchestown over a distance of about 3 miles and ½ furlong (3 miles and 120 yards, or ), and during its running there are seventeen fences to be jumped. The race is scheduled to take place each year during the Punchestown Festival in late April or early May.

The present version of the race was introduced in 1999, when it replaced a previous version for novice chasers only. It was formerly sponsored by Heineken, and it used to be known as the Heineken Gold Cup. It was backed by Diageo between 2005 and 2011, and from 2011 to 2014 sponsored by Tote Ireland.  From 2014 to 2016 the race was sponsored by Bibby Financial Services and since 2017 Ladbrokes Coral has been the sponsor.

The Punchestown Gold Cup usually features horses which ran previously in the Cheltenham Gold Cup. The last to win both races in the same year was Sizing John in 2017.

Records
Most successful horse (2 wins):
 Neptune Collonges – 2007, 2008

Leading jockey since 1999 (6 wins):
 Ruby Walsh – Imperial Call (1999), Commanche Court (2000), Neptune Collonges (2007, 2008), Boston Bob (2014), Kemboy (2019)

Leading trainer since 1999 (6 wins):

 Willie Mullins - Florida Pearl (2002), Sir Des Champs (2013), Boston Bob (2014), Bellshill (2018), Kemboy (2019), Allaho (2022)

Winners since 1999

Earlier winners

 1960 – Oberstown
 1961 – Jungle Cry
 1962 – Coniston
 1963 – Arkle
 1964 – Fort Leney
 1965 – Clusium
 1966 – Crown Prince
 1967 – White Abbess
 1968 – Herring Gull
 1969 – Kings Sprite
 1970 – Glencaraig Lady
 1971 – Dim Wit
 1972 – Ebony Lad
 1973 – Tartan Ace
 1974 – Lough Inagh
 1975 – Fort Fox
 1976 – No Hill
 1977 – Artistic Prince
 1978 – Jack of Trumps
 1979 – Jack's the Buoy
 1980 – Pillar Brae
 1981 – Owens Image
 1982 – Single-U-Jay
 1983 – Whistling Senator
 1984 – By the Way
 1985 – Cerimau
 1986 – Over the Last
 1987 – Darkorjon
 1988 – Vulgan's Pass
 1989 – Carvill's Hill
 1990 – Mixed Blends
 1991 – Local Whisper
 1992 – Second 
 1993 – Fissure Seal
 1994 – Merry Gale
 1995 – Butches Boy
 1996 – Billygoat Gruff
 1997 – Noyan
 1998 – Mahler

See also
 Horse racing in Ireland
 List of Irish National Hunt races

References
 Racing Post:
 , 

 pedigreequery.com – Punchestown Gold Cup – Punchestown.
 racenewsonline.co.uk – Racenews Archive (April 25, 2003).

National Hunt races in Ireland
National Hunt chases
Punchestown Racecourse